Amit Halevi (born 5 June 1971) is an Israeli politician currently serving as a member of the Knesset for Likud since 2023, an office he previously held from 2020 to 2021.

Biography
Halevi was born in Haifa in 1971 and was educated at Yavneh High School in Haifa and the Mercaz HaRav yeshiva in Jerusalem. During his service in the Israel Defense Forces, he served in the 7th Armored Brigade (Israel). He went on to become leader of the software team at Check Point. He graduated from the School of Public Policy at the Hebrew University of Jerusalem and later jointly established the Jewish Statesmanship Center with Assaf Malakh.

He was placed thirty-sixth on the Likud list for the April 2019 elections, but the party won only 35 seats. He was placed thirty-ninth for the September 2019 elections, in which Likud won 32 seats. Although he missed out again in the March 2020 elections in which he was placed thirty-ninth and Likud won 36 seats, he entered the Knesset on 30 July 2020 as a replacement for Amir Ohana, who had resigned his seat under the Norwegian Law after being appointed to the cabinet. Placed thirty-fifth on the Likud list for the 2021 elections, he lost his seat as the party won 30 seats. Halevi returned to the Knesset on 17 January 2023 as a replacement for Amichai Chikli, following his resignation under the Norwegian Law.

References

External links

1971 births
Living people
People from Haifa
Israeli software engineers
Hebrew University of Jerusalem Faculty of Social Sciences alumni
Likud politicians
Israeli people of Turkish-Jewish descent
Israeli people of Lithuanian-Jewish descent
Members of the 23rd Knesset (2020–2021)